M. Alagappa Manickavelu Naicker (14 December 1896 – 25 July 1996)  or simply, M. A. Manickavelu was an Indian politician of the Indian National Congress and founder of the Commonweal Party. He served as the Minister of Revenue for the Madras state from 1953 to 1962. He also served as a member of the Rajya Sabha from 1962 to 1964. During 1964-70 he was the Chairman (presiding officer) of the Tamil Nadu Legislative Council

Early life 

Manickavelu was born to M. Alagappa Naicker on 14 December 1896. Alagappa belonged to numerically strong Vanniyar community of Tamil Nadu. Manickavelu graduated in arts and proceeded to qualify as a lawyer. Manickavelu entered politics early in life and became a member of the Swarajya Party faction of the Indian National Congress. In 1926, he was elected to the Madras Legislative Council.Manickavelu served as a member of the Madras Legislative Council from 1926 to 1937.

Commonweal Party

In 1951, Naicker founded the Commonweal Party which represented Vanniyar interests in Chingleput and North Arcot districts.  In 1951, he contested in the 1951 elections, the first held in independent India as a candidate of the Commonweal Party, an ally of the DMK, and was elected to the assembly once again. Naicker was appointed Minister of Land Revenue and served from 1953 to 1962. When Rajagopalachari stepped down as Chief Minister and was succeeded by Kamaraj, Naicker dissolved the Commonweal Party and merged his organisation with the Indian National Congress. He served as a member of the Madras Legislative Assembly till 1962 when he was elected to the upper house of India's Parliament, the Rajya Sabha. He served as a member of the Rajya Sabha from 1962 to 1964.

Death 

Manickavelu Naicker died in Madras on 25 July 1996.

See also
 S. S. Ramasami Padayatchiyar

Notes

References 

 

1896 births
1996 deaths
Members of the Tamil Nadu Legislative Council
Lok Sabha members from Tamil Nadu
Tamil Nadu ministers
Madras MLAs 1952–1957